Brewer Street is a street in the Soho area of central London, running west to east from Glasshouse Street to Wardour Street.

The street was first developed in the late 17th century by the landowner Sir William Pulteney. It first appears on a map of 1664, and was built up over the following decades from east to west. It is now known for its variety of shops and entertainment establishments typical of Soho.

The street crosses, or meets with, Wardour Street, Rupert Street, Walker's Court, Greens Court, Lexington Street, Great Pulteney Street, Bridle Lane, Sherwood Street, Lower James Street, Lower John Street and Air Street, before meeting with Glasshouse Street at its western end.

References

External links

Streets in the City of Westminster
Shopping streets in London
Streets in Soho